Himantarium gabrielis is a species of centipede in the family Himantariidae.

Description
The head is small and lacks eyes, but has two tentacles with 14 segments. On the dorsal side of the last trunk segment are longitudinal and transversal wide sulci resembling a cross. The body is yellowish to orange in colour and has up to 179 segments, with a pair of legs each. The number of legs is very variable, usually leg-bearing segments vary from 87 to 179 in males and from 95 to 171 in females.

When disturbed, this species emits viscous and proteinaceous secretions from the sternal glands. It feeds on various invertebrates. It can be found under stones or in galleries into the ground. The females protect their eggs with the body until the hatching of their young.

Distribution
This species is widely distributed in the Mediterranean region. It can be found in Albania, Bosnia, Bulgaria, Croatia, France, Greece, Italy, North Macedonia, Portugal, Romania, Slovenia, and Switzerland.

References

Further reading
 Linnaeus C. "Systema Naturae per regna tria nature, secundum classes, ordines, genera, species, cum characteribus, differentiis, synonymis, locis. Editio duodecima, reformata" Holmiae. 1767: 533-1327, see p. 1063.
 Minelli A., Bonato L. (2006) "European geophilomorph centipedes (Chilopoda: Geophilomorpha): a complete synonymical list with taxonomic and nomenclatural notes"

External links
Natura Mediterraneo
Le monde des insectes

Geophilomorpha
Myriapods of Europe
Animals described in 1767
Taxa named by Carl Linnaeus